Llanllawddog is a community located in Carmarthenshire, south-west Wales. The population of the community taken at the 2011 census was 703.

Llanllawddog is bordered by the Carmarthenshire communities of Llanfihangel-ar-Arth, Llanfihangel Rhos-y-Corn, Llanegwad, Abergwili, Bronwydd, and Llanpumsaint.

The community includes the settlements of Rhydargaeau and Pontarsais.

For elections to Carmarthenshire County Council Llanllawddog is part of the Abergwili electoral ward.

References

Communities in Carmarthenshire
Villages in Carmarthenshire